Borlet was a 14th- and 15th-century composer whose life we know extremely little about. It is thought that his name is an anagram of Trebol, a French composer who served Martin of Aragon in 1409 at the same time as Gacian Reyneau and other composers in the Codex Chantilly.

If this Trebol is the same as Trebor then he has six surviving compositions. If not then he is only known for his virelai 'He tres doulz roussignol' and its variation 'Ma tre dol rosignol', which is also a virelai.

See also
Trebor

References

Further reading

 
 French Secular Music of the Late Fourteenth Century, edited by Willi Apel, Cambridge/Massachusetts: Medieval Academy of America, 1950 .
 Fuller, Sarah. The European Musical Heritage 800-1750, New York: Alfred A. Knopf, 1987 .
 Besseler, Heinrich. 'Studien zur Musik des Mittelalters. I. Neue Quellen des 14. und beginnenden 15. Jahrhunderts', Archiv für Musikwissenschaft, VII (1925): 167-252 ( Hé, tres doulz roussignol joly; Roussignolet du bois, dounés).
 Günther, Ursula. 'Der Gebrauch des tempus perfectum diminutum in der Handschrift Chantilly 1047', Archiv für Musikwissenschaft, XVII (1960): 277-297,  p. 297 ( Hé, tres doulz roussignol joly; Roussignolet du bois, dounés).
 Newes, Virginia E. 'Imitation in the Ars nova and Ars subtilior', Revue belge de musicologie, XXXI (1977): 38-59 ( Ma trédol rosignol joly; Aluette cryante apprés li rysignol; Rosignolin del bos jolin)
 LeClercq, Fernand 'Questions à propos d'un fragment récemment découvert d'une chanson du XIV siècle: une autre version de "Par maintes fois"' Musik und Text  in der Mehrstimmigkeit des 14. und 15. Jahrhunderts, Kassel: Bärenreiter, 1984,  ( Hé, tres doulz roussignol joly; Roussignolet du bois, dounés).
 Besseler, Heinrich. 'Studien zur Musik des Mittelalters. I. Neue Quellen des 14. und beginnenden 15. Jahrhunderts', Archiv für Musikwissenschaft, VII (1925): 167-252.
 
 Fischer, Kurt von. 'Ein neues Trecentofragment', Festschrift für Walter Wiora, edited by L. Finscher & C. H. Mahling, Basel and New York: Bärenreiter, 1968, .
 Hasselman, Margaret P. The French Chanson of the Mid-Fourteenth Century, 2 vols, Ph.D. dissertation, University of California (Berkeley): 1970, .
 Newes, Virginia E. 'The relationship of text to imitative technique in 14th century polyphony', Musik und Text in der Mehrstimmigkeit des 14. und 15. Jahrhunderts, edited by U. Günther and L. Finscher, Kassel: Bärenreiter, 1984, .

Ars subtilior composers
French classical composers
French male classical composers
14th-century French composers
15th-century French composers